The Montebello Islands is an archipelago lying off the Pilbara coast of north-western Western Australia.

There are about 180 islands in the group, most of which are small, and many of which have not been individually named or gazetted.

The largest islands are Hermite and Trimouille which, together, comprise about 70% of the collective land area.

Islands

References

Montebello Islands archipelago